The 2005 Colorado State Rams football team  represented Colorado State University in the college football 2005 NCAA Division I-A football season. They played their home games at Hughes Stadium in Fort Collins, CO  and were led by head coach Sonny Lubick.

Schedule

References

Colorado State
Colorado State Rams football seasons
Colorado State Rams football